The North Downs Line is a passenger-train line connecting Reading to Redhill and , along the Brighton Main Line, linking many centres of population in that part of the North Downs which it traverses en route.

The route
Between Redhill and Ash the line runs roughly parallel with the North Downs. Between Reigate and Gomshall the line runs along the foot of the North Downs escarpment in the Vale of Holmesdale. At Guildford it passes through the gap in the Downs formed by the River Wey, with two short tunnels just south of Guildford station, and further west between Guildford and Ash the line runs to the north of the Hog's Back. It then follows the Blackwater valley as far as Sandhurst, before continuing to Reading.

History of the line's construction
The line was authorised by Acts of Parliament in 1846 and 1847 and most of it was constructed by the Reading, Guildford and Reigate Railway Company (RG&RRC), opening in 1849. (A central section of the line near Guildford was built by a predecessor of the LSWR.) The stated objective of the company was to
"secure through traffic passing between the West, North and Midlands and the Channel Ports avoiding the congestion of London and thus saving time, distance and expense."

Although the company had some independent shareholders, it was closely associated with the South Eastern Railway (SER). The original intention was for the SER to build part of the line itself, but this proposal was rejected by Parliament. The independence of the company was only a formality to satisfy Parliament. The two companies had some common directors; an SER engineer controlled the construction of the line. As intended at outset, the line was leased to the SER in 1850, and the two companies finally merged in 1852. The company's relationship with the GWR is described as "enigmatic". The GWR initially offered the company the use of its facilities at Reading station, but terms could not be agreed and a separate station was built.

The SER operated the line from its opening, and ran passenger services on it from Reading to London  via . Even today, the distances along the line between Redhill (22 miles 40 chains) and Shalford Junction (41 mi 60 ch), and between Ash Junction (48 mi 34 ch) and Reading (68 mi 68 ch) are measured from the Charing Cross terminus of the former SER.

Technical information
The line is two-track throughout and is designated W6 loading gauge. Overnight engineering possessions of up to  hours are available.
 Reading to Wokingham is electrified (3rd rail, 750 V DC) and signalled under the track circuit block system from Wokingham Signal Box. Signalling headways are 3 minutes for fast services and  minutes for stopping services.
 Wokingham to North Camp is also under the control of Wokingham Signal Box, although long distances between signals increase headways to 6 minutes and 11 minutes for fast and stopping services respectively (the longest headways on the line). This section is not electrified and the line speed is 70 mph. It is currently planned to transfer the control of Wokingham Signal Box to the new Rail Operating Centre in Basingstoke in 2024.
 North Camp to Shalford Junction is controlled from Guildford (TCB). Signalling headways are 2 minutes for fast services and 3 minutes for stopping services. This section is electrified (3rd rail, 750 V DC) from Aldershot South Junction. The line speed is 70 mph, except for a  restriction at Ash Junction (between Ash and Wanborough) where the line curves sharply, and a 30 mph restriction on the approaches to Guildford station. Resignalling in October 1999 enabled reversible working on the down line through both tunnels between Guildford and Shalford Junction.
 Shalford Junction to Reigate The route leaves the Portsmouth Direct Line at Shalford Junction and there is a 20 mph restriction. From here to Reigate, the line is not electrified. It is controlled by Guildford from Shalford Junction to Gomshall and by Reigate Signal Box (TCB) from Gomshall to Redhill. Signalling headways are 5 minutes for fast trains and 7 minutes for stopping services. The line speed varies from 30 mph (on the approach to Shalford junction) to 70 mph.
 Redhill to Reigate is electrified (3rd rail, 750 V DC). The approach to Redhill is controlled by Three Bridges Signalling Centre and has a 30 mph speed restriction.
The major capacity constraints are the platform capacities of Reading, Redhill and Gatwick Airport stations.

At Reading, North Downs Line services normally terminate at platforms 4, 5 and 6 on the south side of the station, although access to other platforms is possible via Reading Spur Junction with the Great Western Main Line (see map, right). Trains may access the north side of Reading station via a single track underpass. Prior to the 2012 Reading resignalling scheme, trains served platforms 4a and 4b, on the site of the current 5 and 6, was via a short single track section, which severely limited capacity. As part of the resignalling scheme, an additional platform has been provided for North Downs Line services along with dual track access to the resulting three platforms. As a consequence platforms have been re-numbered as 4 (new), 5 (former 4b) and 6 (former 4a).

Capacity restraints at Redhill were also improved by the creation of a new platform and improvements to track work south of the station, as part of the Solum Regeneration project. A new platform at Gatwick Airport was officially opened in February 2014. The new platform at Redhill opened in 2019 from which time additional services were planned to travel through to Gatwick Airport.

Network SouthEast originally planned to electrify the whole route, with a completion date of 1993 being published, but these plans were dropped.

Current passenger services and rolling stock

The main services on the line are provided by Great Western Railway using Class 165 and Class 166 Network Turbo diesel multiple units. At Redhill the Gatwick Airport services reverse to head south along the Brighton Main Line. Trains on this section are now operated (by Southern) as a shuttle service between Redhill and Tonbridge only.

Southern operates services between Reigate and Redhill and onwards to London.

Southern operate frequent services using Class 377s electric multiple units between Reigate and London Victoria, utilising the North Downs Line between Reigate and Redhill stations where access can then be found onto the Brighton Mainline at Redhill.

Passenger services and rolling stock before privatisation

Steam traction was replaced by 3R (Class 206) DEMUs on 4 January 1965. The new trains consisted of two 6S (class 201) coaches from the Hastings Line coupled to adapted 2EPB driving trailer units. As a result of the visible difference in width between the narrow Hastings Line stock and the standard width Hampshire trailer, the units were nicknamed Tadpoles. Additional peak time services were hauled by Class 33 diesel locomotives until May 1977.
The express service from Reading to Gatwick Airport was launched on 12 May 1980, using three-car Class 119 DMUs, based on the Western Region. The trains were especially modified for this service, to create extra luggage space: the buffet counter in the centre coach being removed.  Class 101 three-car units were later used on the route as well.
All of the stations between Shalford and Betchworth inclusive, were recommended for closure in the 1963 Reshaping of British Railways report. The report recommended that the whole of the North Downs Line should be developed as a trunk route.

Freight services 
 no scheduled freight services used the line. The travelling post office train from Dover to  via Tonbridge, Redhill, Guildford and Reading was routed along the line from May 1988 until 2004. The Network Rail 2008 Strategic Business Plan recommended that an enhancement project for the line should be pursued to enable freight traffic from the Channel Tunnel to use the line.

Electrification proposals

Electrification had been shelved prior to World War II as it was felt that little traffic would be generated. In August 1981 Modern Railways magazine studied an electrification strategy for the then Southern Region of British Railways. The article saw potential on the route with the area having developed rapidly, and also with the prospect of Channel Tunnel traffic; cross-country passenger and freight workings might also be diverted along the route. Subsequently, some of the routes considered were electrified, including Redhill – Tonbridge (1994). Until then, North Downs Line services continued from Redhill to Tonbridge.

According to internet sources, electrification of these sections of the North Downs Line was again discussed as part of the Blackwater Valley Rail Survey, in 1991. Motive power from the outset would have been the BR Mark I-based electric stock classes, but the idea was set aside, when the existing diesel multiple units on the region began to be replaced by the current Class 165/166 'Turbos'.

After the privatisation of British Rail, Railtrack electrified a siding on the line at Wokingham.

Electrification was proposed again in 2016 by Surrey County Council, based on research by four local enterprise partnerships. It was "suggested that the electrification would create around 8,000 jobs and stimulate £1.9 billion of economic growth".

Lineside features

It is a memorial to South Eastern Railway's guard Henry Wicks who was killed in an accident here in 1892.

See also

 Great Western Main Line
 Waterloo–Reading line
 Alton Line
 Portsmouth Direct Line
 Mole Valley line
 Brighton Main Line
 Redhill–Tonbridge line

References

Bibliography

Rail transport in Berkshire
Rail transport in Hampshire
Rail transport in Surrey
Railway lines opened in 1849
Railway lines in South East England
1849 establishments in England